The divisions of Khyber Pakhtunkhwa, are the first-order administrative bodies of the Khyber Pakhtunkhwa Province of Pakistan. In total, there are 7 divisions, which are further divided into districts ranging from two to nine per division, depending upon area. Divisions are governed by Commissioners while districts are governed by Deputy Commissioners.

List of divisions
In Pakistan, the division is the administrative unit which is higher in hierarchy than a district, but lower in hierarchy than a province. There are seven divisions in Khyber Pakhtunkhwa, each of which have anywhere between two and nine districts. They are separated by color on the map above, and you can find a list of them below ordered by alphabetical order.

See also
 Divisions of Pakistan

References

K